China National Highway 565 (G565) connects Zanda to G219. It is one of the new trunk highways proposed in the China National Highway Network Planning (2013 - 2030).

See also
 China National Highways

References

Transport in Gansu